Johannes Munnicks or Jean Munniks, Munnix, Munnicx, Munnigk, Munick, Jan Munnickius (16 October 1652 – 10 June 1711) was a Dutch Golden Age medical doctor and writer from the Northern Netherlands.

Biography 
Munnicks was born in Utrecht.  He was the son of a pharmacist who attended the University of Utrecht and who later became a rector there. On 13 December 1670 he graduated with the thesis de Fluore muliebri under Isbrand van Diemerbroeck and became Doctor of Medicine. He wrote Tractatus de urinus, earumque inspectione (Utrecht 1674, Dutch: Verhandelinge der wateren, en hoe men dezelve bezien moet von D. van Haagstraten, Dordrecht 1683).
In 1677 he wrote De utilitate anatomiae and became Lector of Anatomy in Utrecht. In 1678 he became professor of Chirurgie or Surgical Anatomy.

He became city physician of Utrecht.

Works 
 Chirurgia ad praxin hodiernam adornata, in qua veterum pariter ac neotericorum dogmata dilucide exponuntur (Utrecht 1686)
 Liber de re anatomica (Utrecht 1697)
 Complete Works (Amsterdam 1740 posthumously by G. Dicten)

References 
 Christian Gottlieb Jöcher: Allgemeines Gelehrten-Lexicon, Darinne die Gelehrten aller Stände sowohl männ- als weiblichen Geschlechts, welche vom Anfange der Welt bis auf die ietzige Zeit gelebt, und sich der gelehrten Welt bekannt gemacht, Nach ihrer Geburt, Leben, merckwürdigen Geschichten, Absterben und Schrifften aus den glaubwürdigsten Scribenten in alphabetischer Ordnung beschrieben werden. Verlag Johann Friedrich Gleditsch, Leipzig, 3, Sp. 756
 August Hirsch, Ernst Julius Gurlt: Biographisches Lexicon der hervorragenden Aerzte aller Zeiten und Völker. Urban & Schwarzenberg, Vienna and Leipzig, 4, 315
 Verzijl: MUNNI(C)KS (Johannes). In: Philipp Christiaan Molhuysen, Petrus Johannes Blok: Nieuw Nederlandsch Biografisch Woordenboek. (NNBW), Verlag A.W. Sijthoff's Uitgevers-Maatschappij, Leiden, 1637, Bd. 10, Sp. 656–666 (Online)
 Jelle Banga: Geschiedenis van de Geneeskunde en van Hare beoefenaren in Nederland, vóór en na de Stichting der Hoogeschool te Leiden tot aan den Dood van Boerhaave., W. Eekhoff, Leuwarden, 1868, Bd. 2, S. 616 (Online, Dutch)
 Jacobus Kok: Vaderlandsch woordenboek. Johannes Allard, Amsterdam, 1790, Bd. 23, S. 115 (Online, Dutch)
 Jan Christiaan Kobus, W. de Rivecourt: Biographisch woordenboek van Nederland. Verlag A. E. C. van Someren, Zutphen, 1870, Bd. 2, S. 366 (Online, Dutch)

External links 
 Catalogus Professorum Academiae Rheno Traiectinae
 Bibliography (Dutch)

1652 births
1711 deaths
Dutch Golden Age writers
Writers from Utrecht (city)
Physicians from Utrecht (city)